Douglas Turner may refer to:

Sportspeople
Douglas Turner (tennis), American Olympic tennis player
Douglas Turner (sprinter) (born 1966), Welsh track sprinter
Douglas Turner (rower) (1932–2018), American journalist, newspaper executive and rower
Douglas Turner (ATA tennis) from 1930 in tennis
Doug Turner (Canadian football), player for Toronto Argonauts
Doug Turner (curler) from 2013 Canadian Direct Insurance BC Men's Curling Championship – Qualification
Doug Turner (ice hockey) from 1940 Memorial Cup

Others
Douglas H. Turner, American chemist
Doug Turner (born 1969), politician
Doug Turner (Mozilla) (born 1975), contributor to Mozilla